Cobi or COBI may refer to:

People
 Cobi (musician) (Jacob Michael Schmidt, born 1986), an American musician
 Cobi Crispin (born 1988), an Australian wheelchair basketball player
 Cobi Hamilton (born 1990), an American football player
 Cobi Jones (born 1970), an American soccer player

Other uses
 Cobi (mascot), the official mascot of the 1992 Summer Olympics in Barcelona
 Cobi (building blocks), a Polish toy company
 Communist Organisation in the British Isles, a former Marxist–Leninist political party in Britain and Ireland

See also 

 Cobe (disambiguation)
 Coby (disambiguation)
 Kobi (disambiguation)